The Charles Barnes House, at 413 Ontario Ave. in Park City, Utah, was built around 1900.  It was listed on the National Register of Historic Places in 1984.

It is a one-and-a-half-story frame shotgun-style building with a gable roof.  It was deemed significant as one of only three extant shotgun houses in Park City.

References

External links

National Register of Historic Places in Summit County, Utah
Houses completed in 1900